
Bholanath Pandey and Devendra Pandey on December 20, 1978 hijacked Indian Airlines Flight 410, en-route on a domestic flight from Calcutta to Lucknow, and forced it land at Varanasi. They demanded the release of Indira Gandhi (who had been arrested after The Emergency) and the withdrawal of all the cases against her son Sanjay Gandhi. They carried only toy weapons. After keeping 130 passengers and crew hostage in the Boeing 737-200 for some hours, they surrendered in the presence of media.

The Indian National Congress party rewarded them with party tickets for the 1980 state assembly election; both won the election and became members of the legislative assembly of Uttar Pradesh. Bhola served as a Congress MLA from 1980 to 1985 and 1989 to 1991 from Ballia and Devendra remained a member of the house for two terms.
 
Devendra resigned from the party as a general secretary of the Uttar Pradesh Congress Committee. Bhola Pandey also became general secretary of the Indian Youth Congress and secretary of the Indian National Congress. Bhola Pandey unsuccessfully contested the 1991, 1996, 1999, 2004, 2009 and 2014 Lok Sabha elections from Salempur as a Congress candidate. Devendra never served the party as a general secretary ever again of Uttar Pradesh.

See also 

 List of hijackings of Indian aeroplanes#1970s
 List of aircraft hijackings#1970s
 List of accidents and incidents involving airliners by location#India
 List of accidents and incidents involving airliners by airline (D–O)#I
 List of accidents and incidents involving commercial aircraft#1978

References

Further reading 
 Hijacking: A toy-gun affair, India Today, 15 January 1979.
 Tale of two hijackers: One is Congress candidate, other most wanted, The Times of India, 3 April 2014.

External links 
 
 India's tryst with plane hijacks, Business Standard, 18 March 2014.
 IC 410 Plane Hijackers become MLA’s in India, Mythgyaan, 27 March 2019.

Hijackers
Living people
United Progressive Alliance candidates in the 2014 Indian general election
Criminal duos
Year of birth missing (living people)
Aircraft hijackings in India
Crime in Uttar Pradesh
Indian (airline) accidents and incidents
Aviation accidents and incidents in India
Aviation accidents and incidents in 1978
1978 in India
December 1978 events in Asia
Accidents and incidents involving the Boeing 737 Original
Desai administration
Hostage taking in India
Terrorist incidents in India
Indian National Congress politicians from Uttar Pradesh